Merina Jahan Kabita is a Bangladesh Awami League politician and the incumbent Jatiya Sangsad member representing the Sirajganj-6 constituency.

Career 
Merina has been involved in Awami League politics since the beginning of her political career. She is the daughter of academic and intellectual Mazharul Islam. She was inspired to join Awami League as her father was involved in Awami League politics. Kabita became a member of the Awami League Central Executive Committee through the national conference of Awami League held in 2016. She also held the same post in the 2019 conference. The SIrajganj-6 constituency fell vacant after Awami League lawmaker Hashibur Rahman Swapon died of coronavirus on September 2. In October 2021, she was nominated by-election candidate by Awami League in Sirajganj-6 constituency. Awami League nominee Marina Jahan was elected in the by-election held on November 2, 2021.

Early life 
In early life, after obtaining degree in Sociology from University of Dhaka, Merina started her career as a lecturer in Eden Mohila College. Before entering politics, she was the principal of the Begum Badrunnesa Government Girls' College from February 2009 to December 2012.

References 

Living people
Year of birth missing (living people)
11th Jatiya Sangsad members
People from Sirajganj District
Awami League politicians
21st-century Bangladeshi women politicians